In numerical analysis and computational statistics, rejection sampling is a basic technique used to generate observations from a distribution. It is also commonly called the acceptance-rejection method or "accept-reject algorithm" and is a type of exact simulation method.

Rejection sampling is based on the observation that to sample a random variable in one dimension, one can perform a uniformly random sampling of the two-dimensional Cartesian graph, and keep the samples in the region under the graph of its density function. Note that this property can be extended to N-dimension functions.

Description
To visualize the motivation behind rejection sampling, imagine graphing the density function of a random variable onto a large rectangular board and throwing darts at it. Assume that the darts are uniformly distributed around the board. Now remove all of the darts that are outside the area under the curve.  The remaining darts will be distributed uniformly within the area under the curve, and the x-positions of these darts will be distributed according to the random variable's density. This is because there is the most room for the darts to land where the curve is highest and thus the probability density is greatest.

The visualization as just described is equivalent to a particular form of rejection sampling where the "proposal distribution" is uniform (hence its graph is a rectangle).  The general form of rejection sampling assumes that the board is not necessarily rectangular but is shaped according to the density of some proposal distribution that we know how to sample from (for example, using inversion sampling), and which is at least as high at every point as the distribution we want to sample from, so that the former completely encloses the latter. (Otherwise, there would be parts of the curved area we want to sample from that could never be reached.)

Rejection sampling works as follows:

Sample a point on the x-axis from the proposal distribution.
Draw a vertical line at this x-position, up to the maximum y-value of the probability density function of the proposal distribution.
Sample uniformly along this line from 0 to the maximum of the probability density function. If the sampled value is greater than the value of the desired distribution at this vertical line, reject the x-value and return to step 1; else the x-value is a sample from the desired distribution.

This algorithm can be used to sample from the area under any curve, regardless of whether the function integrates to 1.  In fact, scaling a function by a constant has no effect on the sampled x-positions.  Thus, the algorithm can be used to sample from a distribution whose normalizing constant is unknown, which is common in computational statistics.

Theory
The rejection sampling method generates sampling values from a target distribution  with arbitrary probability density function  by using a proposal distribution  with probability density . Note that this requires that the support of  must include the support of —in other words,  whenever .

This means that, with enough replicates, the algorithm generates a sample from the desired distribution . There are a number of extensions to this algorithm, such as the Metropolis algorithm.

This method relates to the general field of Monte Carlo techniques, including Markov chain Monte Carlo algorithms that also use a proxy distribution to achieve simulation from the target distribution . It forms the basis for algorithms such as the Metropolis algorithm.

The unconditional acceptance probability is the proportion of proposed samples which are accepted, which is where , and the value of  each time is generated under the density function  of the proposal distribution .

Intuitively,  is the expected number of the iterations that are needed, as a measure of the computational complexity of the algorithm.

Rewrite the above equation, 
Note that , due to the above formula, where  is a probability which can only take values in the interval . When  is chosen closer to one, the unconditional acceptance probability is higher the less that ratio varies, since  is the upper bound for the likelihood ratio .  In practice, a value of  closer to 1 is preferred as it implies fewer rejected samples, on average, and thus fewer iterations of the algorithm.  In this sense, one prefers to have  as small as possible (while still satisfying , which suggests that  should generally resemble  in some way.  Note, however, that  cannot be equal to 1: such would imply that , i.e. that the target and proposal distributions are actually the same distribution.

Rejection sampling is most often used in cases where the form of  makes sampling difficult.  A single iteration of the rejection algorithm requires sampling from the proposal distribution, drawing from a uniform distribution, and evaluating the  expression.  Rejection sampling is thus more efficient than some other method whenever M times the cost of these operations—which is the expected cost of obtaining a sample with rejection sampling—is lower than the cost of obtaining a sample using the other method.

Algorithm
The algorithm, which was used by John von Neumann and dates back to Buffon and his needle, obtains a sample from distribution  with density  using samples from distribution  with density  as follows:
 Check whether or not .

The algorithm will take an average of  iterations to obtain a sample.

Advantages over sampling using naive methods 
Rejection sampling can be far more efficient compared with the naive methods in some situations. For example, given a problem as sampling  conditionally on  given the set , i.e., sometimes  can be easily simulated, using the naive methods (e.g. by inverse transform sampling):
 Sample  independently, and leave those satisfying  
 Output: 
The problem is this sampling can be difficult and inefficient, if . The expected number of iterations would be , which could be close to infinity. Moreover, even when you apply the Rejection sampling method, it is always hard to optimize the bound  for the likelihood ratio. More often than not,  is large and the rejection rate is high, the algorithm can be very inefficient.

Examples: working with natural exponential families 

Given a random variable ,  is the target distribution. Clearly, is from a natural exponential family. Moreover, the likelihood ratio is Note that  implies that it is indeed a log moment-generation function, that is, . And it is easy to derive the log moment-generation function of the proposal and therefore the proposal's moments. The goal is to sample , . The analysis goes as follows.
 Decide the well chosen  for the proposal distribution. In this setup, the intuitive way to choose  is to set , that is 
 Explicitly write out the target, the proposal and the likelihood ratio

In general, exponential tilting, a parametric class of proposal distribution, solves the optimization problems conveniently, with its useful properties that directly characterize the distribution of the proposal. Indeed, there are deep mathematical reasons for using NEFs.

Drawbacks

Rejection sampling can lead to a lot of unwanted samples being taken if the function being sampled is highly concentrated in a certain region, for example a function that has a spike at some location.  For many distributions, this problem can be solved using an adaptive extension (see adaptive rejection sampling), or with an appropriate change of variables with the method of the ratio of uniforms. In addition, as the dimensions of the problem get larger, the ratio of the embedded volume to the "corners" of the embedding volume tends towards zero, thus a lot of rejections can take place before a useful sample is generated, thus making the algorithm inefficient and impractical. See curse of dimensionality. In high dimensions, it is necessary to use a different approach, typically a Markov chain Monte Carlo method such as Metropolis sampling or Gibbs sampling. (However, Gibbs sampling, which breaks down a multi-dimensional sampling problem into a series of low-dimensional samples, may use rejection sampling as one of its steps.)

Adaptive rejection sampling

For many distributions, finding a proposal distribution that includes the given distribution without a lot of wasted space is difficult.  An extension of rejection sampling that can be used to overcome this difficulty and efficiently sample from a wide variety of distributions (provided that they have log-concave density functions, which is in fact the case for most of the common distributions—even those whose density functions are not concave themselves) is known as adaptive rejection sampling (ARS).

There are three basic ideas to this technique as ultimately introduced by Gilks in 1992:

 If it helps, define your envelope distribution in log space (e.g. log-probability or log-density) instead. That is, work with  instead of  directly.
 Often, distributions that have algebraically messy density functions have reasonably simpler log density functions (i.e. when  is messy,  may be easier to work with or, at least, closer to piecewise linear). 
 Instead of a single uniform envelope density function, use a piecewise linear density function as your envelope instead.
 Each time you have to reject a sample, you can use the value of  that you evaluated, to improve the piecewise approximation . This therefore reduces the chance that your next attempt will be rejected. Asymptotically, the probability of needing to reject your sample should converge to zero, and in practice, often very rapidly.
 As proposed, any time we choose a point that is rejected, we tighten the envelope with another line segment that is tangent to the curve at the point with the same x-coordinate as the chosen point.
 A piecewise linear model of the proposal log distribution results in a set of piecewise exponential distributions (i.e. segments of one or more exponential distributions, attached end to end). Exponential distributions are well behaved and well understood. The logarithm of an exponential distribution is a straight line, and hence this method essentially involves enclosing the logarithm of the density in a series of line segments.  This is the source of the log-concave restriction: if a distribution is log-concave, then its logarithm is concave (shaped like an upside-down U), meaning that a line segment tangent to the curve will always pass over the curve. 
 If not working in log space, a piecewise linear density function can also be sampled via triangle distributions
 We can take even further advantage of the (log) concavity requirement, to potentially avoid the cost of evaluating  when your sample is accepted.
 Just like we can construct a piecewise linear upper bound (the "envelope" function) using the values of  that we had to evaluate in the current chain of rejections, we can also construct a piecewise linear lower bound (the "squeezing" function) using these values as well.
 This squeezing step is optional, even when suggested by Gilks. At best it saves you from only one extra evaluation of your (messy and/or expensive) target density. However, presumably for particularly expensive density functions (and assuming the rapid convergence of the rejection rate toward zero) this can make a sizable difference in ultimate runtime.

The method essentially involves successively determining an envelope of straight-line segments that approximates the logarithm better and better while still remaining above the curve, starting with a fixed number of segments (possibly just a single tangent line). Sampling from a truncated exponential random variable is straightforward. Just take the log of a uniform random variable (with appropriate interval and corresponding truncation).

Unfortunately, ARS can only be applied from sampling from log-concave target densities. For this reason, several extensions of ARS have been proposed in literature for tackling non-log-concave target distributions. Furthermore, different combinations of ARS and the Metropolis-Hastings method have been designed in order to obtain a universal sampler that builds a self-tuning proposal densities (i.e., a proposal automatically constructed and adapted to the target). This class of methods are often called as Adaptive Rejection Metropolis Sampling (ARMS) algorithms. The resulting adaptive techniques can be always applied but the generated samples are correlated in this case (although the correlation vanishes quickly to zero as the number of iterations grows).

See also
 Inverse transform sampling
 Ratio of uniforms
 Pseudo-random number sampling
 Ziggurat algorithm

References

Further reading

Monte Carlo methods
Non-uniform random numbers